Events in the year 2022 in Paraguay.

Incumbents
 President: Mario Abdo Benítez 
 Vice President: Hugo Velázquez Moreno

Events 

2 March – Paraguay voted on a United Nations resolution condemning Russia for its invasion of Ukraine.
23 October – Osvaldo Villalba, a leader of the Marxist–Leninist Paraguayan People's Army rebel group, is killed alongside two other militants during a gunfight with soldiers in Amambay, Paraguay.

Deaths 
10 May – Marcelo Pecci, 45, prosecutor, shot.
31 July – Zulma Gómez, 61, politician, senator (since 2008) and deputy (2003–2008), drowned.

References 

 
Paraguay
Paraguay
2020s in Paraguay
Years of the 21st century in Paraguay